Keewatinook is a provincial electoral division in the Canadian province of Manitoba. The riding existed previously under the name Rupertsland. Starting with the 2011 election, the riding was renamed Kewatinook which means "from the north" in Cree. Effective with the 2019 Manitoba general election, the spelling was corrected to Keewatinook.

It was created in 1915 from territories that were added to the province four years earlier and has existed continuously since that time. The area had been part of the  Grand Rapids and Churchill and Nelson electoral districts for the 1914 Manitoba general election. Originally named Rupertsland, its name was changed as part of the 2008 riding redistribution by the Manitoba Boundaries Commission. Kewatinook is currently the largest riding in the province, a sprawling northern constituency occupying a large portion of the eastern half of Manitoba. It was a smaller constituency until 1989 when it gained a significant amount of territory from the former riding of Churchill.

The current Kewatinook riding stretches from the Ontario border in the southeast to the Nunavut border in the north; it is also bordered by Lac Du Bonnet to the south and Flin Flon, The Pas and Thompson to the west.  Churchill, Manitoba is the most significant community in this wide region.

Elections in Kewatinook before 1966 were usually deferred until a later date than the rest of the province, due to the increased time it took to run elections in the region.

Kewatinook's population in 2006 was 15,560.  In 1999, the average family income was $33,787 (the fourth-lowest in Manitoba), and the unemployment rate was 25%.  Over 34% of the riding's population have less than a Grade 9 education, the highest such rate in the province.  Government services account for 21% of the riding's industry, followed by education services at 17%.

Eighty-seven per cent of Kewatinook's residents are aboriginal, the highest percentage in the province.  Over half the population list Cree as their mother tongue.  In 1999, there was only a 1% immigrant population.

Prior to the 2016 election, the New Democratic Party represented the riding from 1969 to 2016, when Judy Klassen of the Liberal Party defeated longtime MLA Eric Robinson. The current MLA is Ian Bushie of the New Democratic Party. Bushie defeated Jason Harper of the Liberal Party to take the seat in 2019.

List of provincial representatives

Electoral results

1916 by-election

1920 general election

1922 general election

1927 general election

1932 general election

1936 general election

1941 general election

1945 general election

1949 general election

1953 general election

1958 general election

1959 general election

1962 general election

1966 general election

1969 general election

1973 general election

1977 general election

1981 general election

1986 general election

1988 general election

1990 general election

1993 by-election

1995 general election

1999 general election

2003 general election

2007 general election

2011 general election

2016 general election

2019 general election

Previous boundaries

References

Manitoba provincial electoral districts
Churchill, Manitoba